Panay Electric Company, Inc., also known as Panay Electric or simply PECO, is an electric power distribution company in the Philippines. It served the City of Iloilo from 1923 until 2019, when its franchise service expired and MORE Electric and Power Corporation (MORE Power) controversially took over.

History 
PECO was founded on May 14, 1921, by Don Esteban de Rama. On June 12, 1923, it began serving as Iloilo City's electric power distributor after it was acquired by Iloilo Light Company, the first light company outside Luzon founded in 1902. On January 27, 1927, investors behind Iloilo Light Company sold PECO to the Cacho family, which made it the first private Filipino-owned company in Iloilo City.

In 1929, the 8th Legislature passed Act 3665, granting PECO a new 50-year franchise and expanding its service area to include Santa Barbara, Pavia, and Oton. In 1974, under martial law, the company faced technical and financial problems, which resulted in the towns being taken over and serviced by the electric cooperative ILECO 1, which left the City of Iloilo as the only area serviced by PECO.

In 1996, First Philippine Holdings Corporation, under the Lopez family, acquired 30% of the capital stock of PECO, which left 70% for the Cacho family.

On January 18, 2019, PECO's franchise expired but was not renewed by Congress. Billionaire Enrique Razon-owned MORE Electric and Power Corporation (MORE Power) filed an expropriation case to acquire the assets of PECO. MORE Power was granted a 25-year contract to serve and operate the city's electricity distribution system by virtue of Republic Act 11212, signed by President Rodrigo Duterte on February 14, 2019, which ended PECO's 97-year-long operation in Iloilo City.

References 

Electric power companies of the Philippines
Companies based in Iloilo City
Lopez Group of Companies
Companies established in 1921
1921 establishments in the Philippines